The Duel at the Diamond is the name given to the college baseball series between the Virginia Cavaliers baseball team and the VCU Rams baseball team, two NCAA Division I teams that play in Central Virginia.

History 
The two programs first met during the 1979 NCAA Division I baseball season, where Virginia defeated VCU by a score of 17–4.

Starting in the mid-2010s, the games held at VCU were known as the "Duel at the Diamond".

In 2019, the 67th meeting between the two programs will attempt to break an in-state college baseball attendance record. The game will be held on April 30, 2019.

Results 

Note: The 2020 series was cancelled due to the COVID-19 pandemic. The series was to be played at VCU on April 7, 2020, and at UVA on May 12, 2020.

References

External links 
 VCU Baseball
 Virginia Baseball

College baseball rivalries in the United States
1979 establishments in Virginia
Sports rivalries in Virginia
VCU Rams baseball
Virginia Cavaliers baseball